Lori L. Isom is an American pharmacologist, an elected Fellow of the American Association for the Advancement of Science, and a member of the National Academy of Medicine.

Biography 
Isom was raised in Oshkosh, Wisconsin. She received her BA from Washington University in St. Louis in 1982 and her PhD in Pharmacology from Vanderbilt University in 1987. She completed her postdoctoral fellowship in 1993 at the University of Washington in the Catterall lab. Currently, she serves as the chair of the Department of Pharmacology at the University of Michigan, as well as a Professor of Molecular and Integrative Physiology and Professor of Neurology.

Research 

Her research has focused on the physiology and pharmacology of voltage-gated sodium channels and the role of sodium channel mutations in epilepsy, cardiac arrhythmia, and demyelinating disease. She has played a critical role in using translational research to model and find treatment for a rare form of infantile epilepsy known as Dravet syndrome (DS) that increases risk for Sudden Unexpected Death in Epilepsy (SUDEP). The syndrome has been linked to loss of function mutations in the SCN1A gene that causes an improper folding of NaV1.1 channels in GABAergic interneurons. Decreased excitation of GABA interneurons can lead to neuronal hyper-excitability and seizures as well as cardiac arrhythmias. Dr. Isom’s lab has published over 90 articles and received $22 million in funding to investigate genetic links between neuronal excitability and epileptic encephalopathy.

Awards and Honors 
 Elected AAAS Fellow (Neuroscience), 2011
 University of Michigan Distinguished Faculty Award, 2009
 Distinguished Alumni Lecturer, University of Washington Department of Pharmacology, 2009
 National Academy of Medicine

Recent Publications

References 

People from Oshkosh, Wisconsin
Washington University in St. Louis alumni
Vanderbilt University alumni
University of Washington alumni
American pharmacologists
Women pharmacologists
Living people
Year of birth missing (living people)
University of Michigan faculty
Fellows of the American Society for Pharmacology and Experimental Therapeutics